River Gang is a 1945 American crime film directed by Charles David and written by Leslie Charteris and Dwight V. Babcock. The film stars Gloria Jean, John Qualen, Bill Goodwin, Keefe Brasselle, Sheldon Leonard, Gus Schilling and Vince Barnett. The film was released on September 21, 1945, by Universal Pictures.

Plot
Wendy (Gloria Jean), a naive young girl, lives with her kindly Uncle Bill (John Qualen), who has sheltered her from life by instilling a belief in fairy-tales and make-believe. Uncle Bill, a pawn shop owner buy a violin from shady character, Peg-Leg ('Sheldon Leonard' )qv)). When Johnny (Keefe Brasselle, a neighborhood boy and friend of Wendy, connects the violin with the theft of a Stradivarius from a murdered composer, he is kidnapped by a group of thugs. Peg-Leg is killed by the boss of the crime-ring, a face-disguised mystery man known as Raincoat. He tortures Johnny to make him reveal his knowledge of the gang's activities. Meanwhile, Gloria his discovered the identity of 'Raincoat' and seeks the help of Mike ('Bill Goodwin'), the policeman on the beat.

Cast        
Gloria Jean as Wendy
John Qualen as Uncle Bill
Bill Goodwin as Mike
Keefe Brasselle as Johnny
Sheldon Leonard as Peg Leg
Gus Schilling as Dopey Charley
Vince Barnett as Organ Grinder
Robert Homans as Police Captain 
Jack Grimes as Goofy
Mende Koenig as Butch 
Rocco Lanzo as Fatso
Douglas Croft as Slug
Jerry Rush as Gang Member (uncredited)

References

External links
 

1945 films
American crime films
1945 crime films
Universal Pictures films
American black-and-white films
1940s English-language films
1940s American films